Bradley Joseph (born 1965) is an American composer, arranger, and producer of contemporary instrumental music. His compositions include works for orchestra, quartet, and solo piano, while his musical style ranges from "quietly pensive mood music to a rich orchestration of classical depth and breadth".

Active since 1983, Joseph has performed in front of millions of people around the world. He played various instruments in rock bands throughout the Midwest until 1989 when Greek composer Yanni hired him for his core band after hearing a tape of his original compositions. He was a featured concert keyboardist with Yanni through six major tours, most recently in 2003 for the 60-city Ethnicity tour. He appears in the multi-platinum album and concert film, Live at the Acropolis. Joseph also spent five years as musical director and lead keyboardist for Sheena Easton, including a 1995 performance on The Tonight Show with Jay Leno.

Joseph is the founder of the Robbins Island Music label. His solo career began when he independently released Hear the Masses, featuring many of his Yanni bandmates. This debut was followed by Rapture, an instrumental album recorded with a 50-piece orchestra in which Joseph wrote and conducted all of the scores. It was released on the Narada label and reached ZMR Airwaves Top 30. A number of subsequent recordings including Christmas Around the World and One Deep Breath also held positions on ZMR's Top 100 radio chart, with the most recent being Paint the Sky which debuted at #15 in April 2013. Paint the Sky was nominated for Best Neo-Classical Album in the 10th annual ZMR Music Awards. He has produced numerous CDs/DVDs and piano books. His music is included in multiple various-artist compilation albums including the 2008 release of The Weather Channel Presents: Smooth Jazz II.

Biography

Early years
Bradley Joseph was born in Bird Island, Minnesota and raised in Willmar, Minnesota, graduating from Willmar Senior High School in 1983. He learned how to play piano from a how-to piano book he found in the piano bench. One morning his father taught him how to play a boogie-woogie blues tune and by nightfall he could play the entire piece. He started playing classical piano at age eight, taking lessons for a year and a half but was self-taught thereafter. While in junior high, he took a concert field trip where he saw Buddy Rich perform. He recalls, "I sat in the first row and when Buddy's sax player stood up to take his first solo something just clicked — the world closed in around me. I felt the power of music and knew that it was something special, a gift to be shared." Joseph played piano for the jazz band and choir in high school, and trombone through high school and college. When he picked up the horn, he got a whole new perspective on music, gaining insight into all the different timbres available, which was invaluable to him when he started working with orchestras. The first band he was in was a wedding dance band which allowed him to gain experience in every different style of music from polkas to rock and roll to jazz classics. After attending Moorhead State University as a music major, he led some of his own bands around the area that toured Midwest nightclubs. He played sax and guitar in some of these earlier bands but left them to concentrate on just the piano/keyboards. Later, he started performing with guitarist Dugan McNeill, whose U2-like group was signed to Polygram.

Yanni
In 1989, Joseph recorded his first demo tape and sent it off to Greek composer Yanni, who was looking for someone to replace keyboardist John Tesh, as Tesh was launching his own solo career. When Yanni heard Joseph's compositions and arrangements, he was hired over the phone to join his core band, without ever meeting. 

After moving to Los Angeles at age 23, he composed, arranged, and performed alongside Yanni for more than six years, performing in-concert with a number of notable symphony orchestras, touring throughout the U.S. and abroad as Yanni gained worldwide fame. His first show was at the Starplex in Dallas with the Dallas Symphony Orchestra filming a video project. "It was a real trial by fire for me", said Joseph. "First show + 10,000 people + TV cameras equals NERVOUS." He told Jane Fredericksen of the St. Croix Valley Press that "It was a big jump, you don't really realize it at the time, but there's no in-between — going from playing nightclubs to arenas." Some of these early tours included the Reflections of Passion, Revolution in Sound, Dare to Dream, Yanni Live, The Symphony Concerts 1993 and 1994 concert tours, as well as a performance in Germany that was broadcast throughout Europe and seen by 30 to 40 million viewers. Joseph appears on the 1994 multi-platinum album and video, Live at the Acropolis. He recounts, "When I reflect back over the years, one of the high points that stand out include performing at the Acropolis with Yanni. Imagine all these different cultures coming together with the challenges of language, equipment, travel, and weather problems. I still picture the police running their dogs through the dressing rooms to sniff out any bomb possibilities right before the show. People still come up to me and comment how that show has affected their lives."

In the band, Joseph covered a lot of the keyboard parts that Yanni could not for lack of hands in the shows. He assisted with the task of managing the 30 or more synthesizers onstage, and helped layer with the orchestra to create a "full-bodied, live-effect sound". He did have to adjust some parts that did not work well in a live situation and worked extensively on programming sounds for all keyboardists. Joseph said that "Yanni gave us musicians a great deal of freedom to expand the music as well. If you listen to the original recordings he did and what we ended up with in our live recordings, you can really hear the musician's input." He readily credits Yanni's role in his professional development, and for five years of irreplaceable experiences and memories.

Between tours, Joseph worked extensively in recording studios on music ranging from rock and pop to rhythm and blues and orchestration with numerous artists from RCA, Epic, Warner Brothers, and Polygram Records, in addition to performing in an elaborate national keyboard show tour with various musicians. In 2003, he returned for the 60-city Ethnicity tour.

Sheena Easton
Joseph also performed with Sheena Easton for four years as her co-musical director and lead keyboardist. He went from Yanni to Easton and back to Yanni in a few years. "It was a great transition from Yanni because it made me musically aware again", he said in reference to Easton's R&B style. "I went back to where I started but it felt like a new invention."

 Wheeler questioned how he got hooked up with Easton; Joseph answered that he was recommended by a former road manager. He was included in a try-out with four others, rehearsed with the band, they then cut it down to two, and rehearsed with Sheena for the final cut. Joseph anticipated they would ask him to do a solo on at least one of the songs he was asked to play during the audition, so he wrote a solo for all three songs, which was ultimately the reason he was hired for the job.

In a 1995 interview, he said that after five years of touring with Yanni and working on his own debut album, he needed a break. Yanni was still building his career and maintained a hectic concert schedule. Working with Easton, on the other hand, was "the best of both worlds". "She just adopted a baby and is pretty settled in", said Joseph. Tour venues with her included Japan, Indonesia, Puerto Rico, and the United States, as well as routine appearances in Las Vegas and Atlantic City. In March 1995, he appeared with her on The Tonight Show with Jay Leno when she performed her new single at the time, "My Cherie".

Solo career

More Core Records
In 1994, between world tours, Joseph released his debut album, Hear the Masses, a self-produced, self-published release under the More Core Records label consisting of 10 original compositions. He invited most of the Yanni band to contribute.

Narada
 
Joseph's style attracted the attention of Narada Productions, a Virgin Records subsidiary, via the World Wide Web. A representative for Narada came across his website and downloaded some music. This sparked their interest and resulted in signing Joseph to a multi-record deal, according to Peter Spellman of the Berklee College of Music. The outcome was Rapture, containing intimate piano pieces, quartets, and full orchestral works. It reached ZMR's "Airwaves Top 30" at No. 15 in July 1997. This album was recorded at a number of different studios including Captain and Tennille's studio in Los Angeles, and Pachyderm Studio in Cannon Falls, Minnesota. In addition to a core band including Charlie Adams on percussion, Charlie Bisharat on violin, and Steven Trochlil on clarinet, Joseph brought in a 50-piece orchestra, and conducted and wrote all the scores. Ken Moore of the Naples Daily News cites, "Joseph's music is backed by 15 talented musicians, some playing three or more different instruments, that make up a symphony of sounds ranging from quietly pensive mood music to a rich orchestration of classical depth and breadth." Wind and Wire Magazine contributor, Michael Debbage, recalls, "It was the year 1997 and New Age music had already peaked commercially as the interest and exposure seemed to lag. The genres main labels – Narada, Windham Music, and Higher Octave – were beginning to explore worldly themes versus the warm, earthly, acoustic themes that prior artists had established. It appeared that the abundance of new artists was becoming a dying breed. An exception to the rule was Bradley Joseph, who released his first mainstream album Rapture to glorious reviews, and to this day it remains his tour de force."

Robbins Island Music
Although Joseph said that working with Narada was a great experience music-wise, he did not like the lack of control over the end product, and asked to be released from his contract. He started Robbins Island Music in 1998, composing, producing, and distributing his own recordings. Solo Journey was released and consists of eleven soft piano compositions that are based on mood and not on melody. It is characterized by Debbage as being a "scaled down introspective, ... and while simplistic was still breath-taking".

Later releases include Christmas Around the World reaching ZMR's Top 100 Radio Playlist; and One Deep Breath also holding a position on ZMR's Top 100 Radio Chart for over six months. Bill Binkelman writes that while he doubts fans of Liquid Mind or other mainly electronic new age music artists would wholly embrace the overt romanticism of piano-led tracks like 'Dancers Waltz' or 'Dreamer's Lullaby', there is definite appeal on the album for fans of adult contemporary piano pieces, as well as for lovers of the more minimal approach to new age music." Reviewing for Allmusic, Jim Brenholts describes One Deep Breath as a set of smooth adult contemporary pieces in which Joseph adds "world music flair and inspirational touches". "The vocal expressions by Clystie Whang and Joseph have devotional qualities that weave through the atmospheres and soundscapes smoothly." 

Joseph returned as a featured instrumentalist during Yanni's 2003 Ethnicity world tour, and wrote his sixth album on stage after sound checks. The Journey Continues, a sequel to Solo Journey, features Joseph on solo piano. Debbage writes, "The magical world of movies has a knack for exploring sequels. There is the beauty and beast effect when taking this pathway. The creative beauty allows the viewers to see the continued growth of its characters. The beastly aspect of this exploration is the Hollywood exploitation of an almost guaranteed return on its investment with no regard for its creative progression that usually sees diminishing returns. Bradley Joseph has decided to walk this tightrope by following up with Solo Journey that was released back in 2000. I am glad to report that The Journey Continues is entrenched in beauty, holding up well to its predecessor."

Subsequent releases include For the Love of It, Piano Love Songs, and Hymns and Spiritual Songs. On these albums, Joseph arranges piano, orchestra, and soft rhythms to cover melodies such as "I'll Never Fall in Love Again" (Burt Bacharach), "Fields of Gold" (Sting), and "Ave Maria" (Schubert). He has produced numerous CD and DVD projects designed for pets in a Music Pets Love series. He has also produced a four-CD set of Nature Sounds and has published many of his compositions in sheet music form. His music is used throughout the DVD, Isle Royale Impressions Volume II, containing video footage by Carl TerHaar of scenery and wildlife from the Isle Royale National Park in Michigan.

In April 2013, Joseph released his first album of original compositions in 10 years entitled Paint the Sky which debuted at #15 on ZMR's Top 100 Radio Chart. It is self-described as "piano instrumentals with a cinematic feel". He received requests from listeners to do another CD with original compositions that incorporate lush orchestration along with the piano, similar to Hear The Masses and Rapture. Kathy Parsons of MainlyPiano states that "Joseph is obviously a very versatile musician, and there are a lot of influences and musical styles that meld together to make Paint the Sky an exceptional musical experience." Michael Debbage of MainlyPiano writes that Paint the Sky represents Joseph’s most complete recording since his landmark album Rapture. He goes on to say that "whether you have enjoyed Joseph’s more spatial recordings or his deeper embellished adventures, Paint the Sky essential is a musical rainbow of where Joseph has been and where he can potential go."

Accolades and achievements
Joseph was named one of the "Ten Outstanding Young Minnesotans" (TOYM) of 2004 by the Minnesota Jaycees. In April 2008 he was presented the "WPS Foundation Arts and Academics Hallmarks of Pride" award for outstanding achievements by an alumnus.

Joseph's music has been heard in regular rotation in the United States and Canada by more than 160 major radio networks including XM and Sirius satellite radio, DMX; in the United Kingdom including RTÉ lyric fm; as well as airwaves in Japan, Spain, China, South-East Asia, Thailand, Germany, Switzerland, and Russia. Airlines such as Aeroméxico, AirTran, Frontier, and JetBlue feature his music in their in-flight music programs. The Weather Channel also utilizes his compositions during the "Local on the 8s" segments, and the song "Friday's Child" is included in their 2008 compilation release, The Weather Channel Presents: Smooth Jazz II.

Paint the Sky (2013) was nominated for Best Neo-Classical Album in the 10th annual ZMR Music Awards.

Thoughts on success as an independent artist
Having experienced both avenues of recording on a major label and later choosing to be an independent artist, a combination of musicianship with business know-how has helped give Joseph staying power in the notoriously competitive world of music. He spends most of his time writing songs, composing arrangements, making recordings, and publishing and distributing his works. "I'm my own boss. I can do what I want. I can change directions", he told West Central Tribune's Anne Polta. As an independent, business is a prime concern and can take over if not controlled, Joseph said. "A lot of musicians don't learn the business. You just have to be well-rounded in both areas. You have to understand publishing. You have to understand how you make money, what's in demand, what helps you make the most out of your talent." "I couldn't license my music if it wasn't mine", he said. "It has allowed me to create CDs. It separates you from the million other great players."

In an interview with author Cicily Janus, Joseph commented that his perspective has changed a great deal from when he was younger. He said, "Everything I did was focused on making good music and being a great musician, not running a business. Yet it takes a businessperson to bring music to the masses." But some artists just want to be involved in the music and do not like the added problems or have the personality to work with both. Joseph suggests newer artists read and study both courses and pick one that best suits their needs and wants. He advises, "...to keep your eyes and ears open all the time. All the information you need is available to you to have a successful career in music, if you're paying attention, and not closed off to anything." He explains, "Time and persistence has shown me that I can succeed at sharing my art with others as a musician while running my own music business. And that kind of success is as good as I could have ever wished for."

When asked by Wheeler what brought him back to Minnesota after living in Los Angeles and traveling around the world, Joseph replied, "The first thing business people say is 'First and foremost, if you want to be successful, live where you want to live'." He grew up there and family were important to him. When he decided to become a solo artist he wanted to be comfortable in his environment and moved back.

Composition and musical style

On composing

In an interview with Indie Journal, Joseph said that when writing music he prefers to concentrate on the melody first, stating, "Basically, I write from a two-person standpoint. First, I let the song take hold and I put down the idea as a raw emotional statement. Then I let it breathe and come back, approaching from more of an objective point of view. This allows me to rediscover the true meaning I intended in the beginning, shedding new light on how I can best represent that to the listener." This same concept is explained again in a taped interview with the Government Television Network with Joseph explaining that a lot of times he may only come up with part of a melody. Then he would let it rest and come back to it and see if it feels right. Then he would start "building around it", like putting a car together - start with a frame and then start building things around it. Musically, he tries to connect a common bridge between such exhilarating feelings as performing at the Acropolis, to the emotions each and every one feels every day. "In the end, a good melody will always stand the test of time", says Joseph.

Debbage comments, "One strength of Bradley Joseph as an artist has been his keen ability to write inspiring music with appropriately titled songs that express that thought non-verbally". Joseph explained to Janus that, "Through instrumental music, I'm allowed to come up with musical ideas that allow the listener to create their own impression of my song. If you add lyrics about a girl in the song, the listener doesn't have a choice of what the song is about, it's told to them. My musical writings allow me to express anything. It's easier for me to tell a story of something I've encountered this way than to verbalize it. And my feelings are explored more in my compositions compared to what I could ever say in a few sentences." He believes that "music allows a person to express their deepest thoughts, thoughts that cannot be expressed with just words." He also believes that the spiritual aspect of creating is to "find something deep within yourself that can only be created by you"..."Your spiritual self cannot be copied and that's why it's so significant in life and music", he says. Parsons goes on to say, "The influence of years of touring with Yanni is apparent in the richness of Joseph's sound, but his musical voice is his own." Yanni once said, "Bradley, your extreme sensitivity is your greatest gift". Joseph later realized what Yanni meant was that he needed that as a composer, that it was a crucial component "to be sensitive to what you see and to be able to apply that to music".

Polta reports that he often references the past when he names his songs and his music is frequently reminiscent of his rural Minnesota roots. "Wind Farmer" was inspired by childhood visits to a relative's farm near Olivia, and his company, Robbins Island Music, is named after a city park in Willmar.

Joseph employs a variety of instruments to compose including the Korg Triton music workstation, Korg SG-1 piano, and occasionally Korg M1. Rack units have included Roland JD-800, and Roland JV-1080 which he says is "great for string layers". The Alesis D4, Yamaha SY22, and Yamaha TG77 which has "some nice ethereal textures" have been utilized; working also with E-mu Systems Proteus 1, Proteus 2, and the E-5000 sampler because it is "easy to use and has a great library".

Musical style

Joseph's musical style and direction have varied over time, having released more than two hundred original compositions and arrangements since 1994. "When I write it, it just kind of moves, because where I am in life is different", Joseph said. "So as I get older, it kind of changes."

Hear the Masses and Rapture

Joseph's recordings can offer full orchestrations such as in Hear the Masses and Rapture that combine smooth jazz with contemporary instrumental themes. A review of Rapture from New Age Voice states Joseph "paints romantic pictures in sound with voices and instruments that escalate from quiet, intimate passages to big, energetic movements". "The arrangements are structured so that the trumpet can lead a line out on 'Be Still' signaling an introspective sort of mood; yet the strings swell on 'The Passage' engulfing the listener in an ocean of sound." "Even cuts that start quiet, such as 'Healing the Hollow Man' or 'Blue Rock Road' ebb and flow between quiet moments and crescendos."

Solo Journey and The Journey Continues
In contrast, albums such as Solo Journey and The Journey Continues are considered to be "stripped back and basic" by Debbage, with the latter featuring "Joseph and his piano with no additional clutter". "There is color in the songs via their understated melodies." As examples, Debbage describes Joseph as using a chord progression that translates into a strolling rhythm in the song "The Road Ahead". Solo Piano Publications contributor, Kathy Parsons, writes, "...'The Long, Last Mile' starts out with a bittersweet melody, and then builds in intensity and complexity with cello, winds, and ethereal sounds intertwining around the piano. Then it breaks off, and the opening melody returns."

One Deep Breath
For the 2002 album One Deep Breath, Joseph combines "structured melodic pieces and free-form ambient compositions", which "departs dramatically from the previous more explosive and dynamic music on his first two recordings, Hear the Masses and Rapture". Binkelman writes, "It is an album with two distinct 'feels' to it: the more serene new age/ambient soundscapes that bookend the inner tracks and the more radio-friendly and mainstream music in-between." For instance, the song "Dance of Life" was inspired by Antonín Dvořák's opera, "Rusalka". It is a bit more straightforward in its piano presentation, and will probably appeal the most to hardcore fans of solo instrumental music, says Instrumental Weekly. Then the album closes with its title track, "One Deep Breath", that "floats and meanders for more than ten minutes, bringing in ocean sounds". It is "far and away the most ambient of everything else to be found here", and is "stunning, both in its execution and how radical a change it is from what has come before".

Christmas Around the World and Classic Christmas
Debbage depicts "A Minnesota Snowfall" from Christmas Around the World as taking "a more naked, bare-boned ballad approach". While discussing Classic Christmas, Gerry Grzyb, chairman of the University of Wisconsin–Oshkosh sociology department, states that Joseph's usual approach is to play the carol straight, and then add his own twists. "... he's very effective at that—he doesn't stray as far as a jazz or classical organ improviser might, but he does keep the interest up." Grzyb says that the same applies to Joseph's earlier Christmas Around the World CD, which he found even more interesting because of the use of other instrumental sounds.

Suites & Sweets
Joseph has also produced numerous CDs that include cover arrangements for piano and orchestra. The 2009 release of Suites & Sweets features compositions by Beethoven, Mozart, Bach, and other classical composers. Joseph told Fredericksen that he, "took the best parts and movements out of those classical songs … and made it soft and calm all the way through."

Paint the Sky

After requests from listeners for Joseph to do another CD with original compositions that incorporate lush orchestration along with the piano, similar to Hear The Masses and Rapture, Joseph released Paint the Sky in April 2013. It is self-described as "piano instrumentals with a cinematic feel". John P. Olsen of New Age Music World writes that "Paint The Sky ...is best expressed by the near even number of songs with upbeat melodies and lively rhythms, with the balance centered by a light, casual relaxed atmosphere...with importance given to melodic rhythm and phrasing." In another review of Paint the Sky, Bill Binkelman of Wind and Wire says that "Joseph is one of the very best artists when it comes to crafting piano instrumentals augmented by the spot-on application of an assortment of keyboard embellishments, from standard orchestral accompaniment to more textural/new age elements". Kathy Parsons of MainlyPiano states "The thirteen pieces ...range from tender to majestic. Several pieces are solo piano and others are orchestrated with keyboards to give a vibrant, cinematic effect."

About this album, Binkelman describes the song "Inside the Stars" as "an uptempo, joyous lead piano melody accented by bouncy rhythms played on kit drums, thumping bass, and tambourine plus superlative orchestral strings". Michael Debagge of MainlyPiano states that "the optimism of this album is felt immediately courtesy of the buoyancy of 'Inside The Stars', filled with Joseph's nifty piano work more in the vein of Bruce Hornsby, then layered in strings and percussion work".

In an in-depth analysis of the composition "In Dreams Awake", Binkelman opines that this song bears a strong contemporary classical influence and that some people might even hear strains of Philip Glass' music. He says there is an exultant feel to the melody, but because Joseph maintains absolute control of nuance and shading the song never descends into overblown melodrama or bombast. As the track progresses, the mood and style shifts into a more identifiable new age motif, with more textural synths, bell tones and bell trees, and a more pronounced sweeping sensation of subdued grandeur. The Glass-like motif returns for the song's finale. Parsons characterizes this same song as "a concept piece that begins with an intense and intriguing theme for cello or viola and strings. Building as it evolves, it never takes a breath until near the end of the theme. From there, the piece becomes dreamy and ambient, "floating effortlessly" on keyboard sounds until the original strings re-enter, increasing to the intensity of the first theme". At the same time, Debbage notes "...the multi-movements found on the challenging 'In Dreams Awake'..." and says that it "...opens with an extended piece of strings that almost appear to be battling against each other, only to move into a beautiful dreamy midsection to once again return to the more chaotic strings, much like our nonsensical dreams".

Binkleman goes on to say that the song "Into the Big Blue" should instantly call Aaron Copland to mind – it has the same BIG orchestral/cinematic sound to it, along with Copland-esque western rhythm and melodic motifs. Similarly, Debbage states that this song brings to mind the musical opening theme of that old western television show The Big Valley.

In reference to the song "Secrets of the Sun", Binkelman describes "lush strings and gorgeous new age synths with the piano melody here brimming with a blend of the ethereal and the romantic with a dash of wistfulness besides". The synth sounds remind him a little of Ray Lynch. Parsons details this as "much calmer and more graceful with a piano melody and keyboard enhancements". Debbage writes that "the remainder of the album is filled with Joseph's uncanny ability to compose elegant and emotive ballads. Back track to 'Secrets Of The Sun' that gently sways in the piano and string arrangements with similar results found on 'The Edge Of My Heart'.

Genres and radio formats
Generally, Joseph's music gets airplay in the adult contemporary, smooth jazz, easy listening, and beautiful music radio formats, and while some is classified in the new age genre, he considers contemporary instrumental to fit his style of playing the best. In discussing Rapture, John Blake of The Atlanta Journal notes that often new age music sounds as if it should be played in a supermarket. The songs can sound like musical cotton candy — soft, airy and ultimately uninteresting. "For the most part, Bradley's music doesn't make that mistake." "The music is cinematic, filled with introspective piano solos, swelling violins, and a hypnotic song pacing that allows the listener to daydream." Along the same line, Michael Debbage of Mainly Piano says that Rapture almost single-handedly gave a sense of hope that there was much more that the New Age genre could offer. Cicily Janus remarks that, "Although Bradley has been, at times, pigeon holed into an offshoot of jazz, his message through his music is universal in its appeal and soothing qualities."

Discography

Studio albums
 1994 - Hear the Masses 
 1997 - Rapture, Narada
 1999 - Solo Journey 
 2000 - Christmas Around the World
 2002 - One Deep Breath 
 2003 - The Journey Continues 
 2005 - For the Love of It 
 2006 - Piano Love Songs 
 2007 - Hymns and Spiritual Songs 
 2008 - Classic Christmas 
 2008 - Music Pets Love Series (2004–2008)
 2009 - Suites & Sweets 
 2010 - "Rest and Relax" Series: Forest Sounds, Ocean Waves, Thunder, and Nature Sounds with Music 
 2013 - Paint the Sky

Credits
 1993 - In My Time, Private Music
 1994 - Live at the Acropolis, Private Music
 1999 - The Private Years, Private Music
 2010 - The Essential Yanni, Masterworks

See also 
List of ambient music artists

Notes

External links

 
 Official Website
 
 

 

1965 births
Living people
People from Willmar, Minnesota
American classical pianists
Male classical pianists
American male pianists
20th-century American keyboardists
American multi-instrumentalists
American music arrangers
American male organists
American pop pianists
American performers of Christian music
Composers for piano
Easy listening musicians
American jazz composers
American male jazz composers
Light music composers
Minnesota State University Moorhead alumni
Music directors
Narada Productions artists
New-age pianists
New-age synthesizer players
People from Bird Island, Minnesota
Postmodern composers
Smooth jazz pianists
American male classical composers
American classical composers
20th-century American pianists
Jazz musicians from Minnesota
Classical musicians from Minnesota
21st-century American keyboardists
21st-century classical pianists
21st-century organists
20th-century American male musicians
21st-century American male musicians
21st-century American pianists
American organists